Cochrane North was an electoral riding in Ontario, Canada. It was created in 1914 as the riding of Cochrane. In 1926 the riding was split into Cochrane North and Cochrane South. It was abolished in 1996 before the 1999 election.

From the 1987 election until its abolition, the riding included most of the District of Cochrane (except Timmins, the geographic townships bordering Timmins on the west, Iroquois Falls, and all the communities and townships south of a line extending east from the northern boundary of Iroquois Falls to Lake Abitibi and then all communities and townships south of Lake Abitibi). The riding also included the two geographic townships in Algoma District immediately south of Hearst and all of Kenora District east of the prolongation of the westerly border of Cochrane District. The riding was abolished in 1998 into Timmins—James Bay, Algoma—Manitoulin and Timiskaming—Cochrane. Prior to 1926, the riding was known as Cochrane.

Members of Provincial Parliament

References

Former provincial electoral districts of Ontario